Samuel Bingham Endicott (born August 13, 1978) is an American singer, songwriter, multi-instrumentalist, actor and director. He is best known as the lead vocalist of The Bravery with whom he recorded three studio albums.

Career
At age 11 Endicott began playing guitar and at 12 switched to bass guitar. By age 13 he was an established bass player in the Washington, D.C. area, playing in numerous punk and harDCore bands, most notably Stain, with Geoff Turner of Gray Matter and Colin Sears of Dag Nasty. He has stated that his biggest influence as a bass player is Joe Lally of Fugazi, and he initially sought to emulate Lally's melodic style of playing.

While attending Vassar College in Poughkeepsie, New York, Endicott was classmates with future Bravery keyboardist John Conway. The two began a musical partnership, playing together in various projects in the Poughkeepsie area.  After graduating with B.A. in Psychology, Endicott and Conway moved to New York City, where their musical partnership continued. In 2003 he switched from bass guitar to vocals and began writing, recording and producing the music that would become the first Bravery album.  Guitarist Michael Zakarin joined after answering an advert in a local paper, and brought with him bassist Mike Hindert, a classmate of his from Georgetown University in Washington, DC.  Drummer Anthony Burulcich was living in Boston where he had studied percussion at Berklee College of Music.  After the death of his sister, Burulcich moved back to his childhood home in Long Island New York to be with his family.   On the day Burulcich was moving, while driving with his belongings in a U-Haul truck, Endicott called him.  The Bravery went on to release their debut album in March 2005.

Endicott is a multi-instrumentalist playing guitar, bass, vocals, keyboards and programs electronic drums and synthesizers. Endicott has also co-directed and written a number of the Bravery's music videos, making his music video directing debut with the video for the Bravery's "Believe" in 2008. He is also credited as producer on the Bravery's debut album, as well as the  "Moon" portion of their The Sun and the Moon Complete, described as an "alternate take" on their second release The Sun and the Moon.  Endicott co-produced the Bravery's third studio album Stir The Blood.

While recording the Stir the Blood album, Endicott and producer John Hill co-wrote three songs with Shakira for her album She Wolf, including the single She Wolf and critically acclaimed song "Men In This Town". She Wolf and its Spanish version counterpart "Loba," had major commercial success worldwide.

Endicott, alongside Switch, Santigold, and John HIll also co-wrote the Christina Aguilera song "Monday Morning" for Aguilera's album Bionic.

Endicott also appears as an actor in the independent film Modern Romance.

Endicott was featured on the February 2005 cover of L'oumo Vogue.

Endicott was a feature model for the 2008 European Gap Campaign.

Endicott formed a new band with friends called The Mercy Beat. The band released a three-song EP in 2014 which he has described as experimental punk soul.

Early life

Background and education
Endicott grew up in Brookmont, Maryland. He is an only child of William Endicott and Abigail Bingham Endicott, a vocalist and teacher.

Endicott attended Georgetown Day School before transferring to Phillips Academy in Andover, Massachusetts.

He is a great-great-great-grandson of Charles Lewis Tiffany.

He is a great-grandson of Hiram Bingham III.

Personal life
According to a November 2009 interview from the Spinner website, Endicott reported that he has synesthesia. In 2011, he relocated to Los Angeles, California.

On October 23, 2021 Endicott married Maria Chon who is one of the managers of the artist, Halsey. They divorced shortly after in 2022.

References

External links 
 The Bravery
 The Bravery's Myspace
 The Mercy Beat's Soundcloud

1974 births
American rock singers
American multi-instrumentalists
American music video directors
Vassar College alumni
Living people
People from Bethesda, Maryland
People from Maryland
Phillips Academy alumni
Singers from Maryland
Singers from New York (state)
21st-century American singers
21st-century American male singers
Georgetown Day School alumni